Lepanthes tridentata is a species of orchid native to Central America.

References

External links 

tridentata
Orchids of Central America